KICB (88.1  FM) is a non-commercial radio station that serves the Fort Dodge, Iowa area.  The station broadcasts an Alternative format.  KICB is licensed to Iowa Central Community College.

Iowa Central Community College's Radio Broadcast Program uses the station to provide hands-on experience and training for students who are pursuing a career in the radio industry.

The transmitter and broadcast antenna are located on the campus.

References

External links

 KICB website

ICB
Fort Dodge, Iowa
Radio stations established in 1971
1971 establishments in Iowa